Union Library Company is a historic library building located at Hatboro, Montgomery County, Pennsylvania.  It was built in 1851, and is a -story, rectangular stuccoed stone building, with a -story rear wing.  The front facade features a colonnaded porch with four Doric order columns and is in the Greek Revival style.  The rear wing has side porches.  The Union Library Company was founded about 1755, and is the third oldest library in Pennsylvania.

It was added to the National Register of Historic Places in 1980.

References

External links

Union Library of Hatboro website

Libraries on the National Register of Historic Places in Pennsylvania
Greek Revival architecture in Pennsylvania
Infrastructure completed in 1851
Buildings and structures in Montgomery County, Pennsylvania
1851 establishments in Pennsylvania
National Register of Historic Places in Montgomery County, Pennsylvania